The Leduc RL.21 was a single engine, single seat light aircraft built in the late 1950s in France.  Designed to achieve high speeds from modest engine power, it set seven class records in the early 1960s.

Design and development
Between 1939 and 1975 the amateur aircraft designer and builder René Leduc (not the ramjet designer of the same name) completed and flew five different lightplanes, two of which set records in their class.  The RL.21 was a low wing monoplane with its wings braced to the upper fuselage by a pair of inverted-V struts. It was powered by a  SNECMA-Régnier 4L-00 four cylinder inverted air-cooled inline engine driving a two blade propeller.  A low, smoothly streamlined canopy covered the single seat cockpit and merged aft into a raised rear fuselage.  The empennage was conventional.  The RL.21 had a tailwheel undercarriage with spatted main wheels on cantilever legs, mounted on the wings approximately below the ends of the wing struts.

Leduc built the RL.21 over a period of six years with assistance from Sud Aviation and from the Nantes Technical School. It flew for the first time in August 1960. Throughout these flights the pilot was Raymond Davy.

Specifications

References

1960s French sport aircraft
RL.21
Single-engined tractor aircraft
Low-wing aircraft
Aircraft first flown in 1960